Bellard is a surname. Notable people with the surname include:
Chris Bellard (born 1979), American rapper known professionally as Young Maylay
Emory Bellard (born 1927), college football coach
Eugenio de Bellard Pietri (1927–2000), founder of speleology in Venezuela
Fabrice Bellard, French computer programmer, original author of FFmpeg and QEMU
Bellard's formula, used to calculate the nth digit of π in base 2